Micropterix erctella is a species of moth belonging to the family Micropterigidae which was described by Walsingham, Lord Thomas de Grey, in 1919. It is endemic to Sicily.

References

External links
lepiforum.de

Micropterigidae
Endemic fauna of Sicily
Moths described in 1919
Moths of Europe
Taxa named by Thomas de Grey, 6th Baron Walsingham